Philadelphia City Paper was an alternative weekly newspaper in Philadelphia, Pennsylvania. The independently owned paper was free and published every Thursday in print and daily online at citypaper.net. Staff reporters focused on labor issues, politics, education and poverty. Critics reviewed the city's arts, entertainment, literary and restaurant scene. Listings of concerts, art exhibits, dance performances and other events were carried in the paper and in a comprehensive online events calendar.

The publication was established in November 1981 as a spinoff of the now-defunct WXPN Express newsletter. Philadelphia City Paper distributed 70,000 copies in more than 2,000 locations throughout Philadelphia, its suburbs and South Jersey. Its more than 2,000 orange-colored boxes and wire racks were found in Center City Philadelphia in cafes, small businesses and on many university campuses.

Each year, City Paper published a City Guide for college students and new residents.

Its monthly readership was 521,000, which was verified by Scarborough Research.

Founder Bruce Schimmel sold the paper to the Rock family (Milton L. Rock and his son Robert H. Rock) in 1996. In 2014, Metro acquired the City Paper from the Rock family. In 2015, the City Paper was sold to Broad Street Media, owner of Philadelphia Weekly. The last edition was published on October 8, 2015.

Print edition
City Paper was broken into a variety of different sections.

Naked City: The paper's news section regularly featured A Million Stories, an offbeat analysis of current events in the city, the Bell Curve, the city's "quality-o-life-o-meter".

Cover Story: Typically a long-form feature, news, or service package, taking on various writing forms such as narrative, question-and-answer, and explanatory. The paper's front page art or design was usually centered on the cover story's content.

Arts & Entertainment:  Reviews and short show previews of both local and national talent. The section covered a broad swath of genres, including music, photography, performing arts, books and visual arts.

Movies: Reviews and picks of local, independent and mass-produced films. Lead reviews were usually written by Sam Adams, Shaun Brady, or Drew Lazor. The section also included movie shorts (200-word graded reviews) and local repertory film listings.

Events: A calendar of noteworthy events in the city, highlighting everything from clothing boutiques and book signings to festivals and music performances with quick, witty previews.

Food & Drink: Reviews and features centered on local restaurants, cafes and bars, and also chronicles the goings-on of Philadelphia's restaurant community, such as openings and closings. Reviews were mostly handled by critic Adam Erace.

Online edition
City Papers website featured the digital version of the print edition, along with links to blogs and social networking pages.

Blogs
The Naked City: The news blog, covering anything from breaking news to quirky stories from the community.

Meal Ticket: The paper's food and drink blog.

Shop Savvy: Brenna Adams' expertise on shopping on a budget.

Data Points: A look at Philly's tech universe.

Let's Get It On: Rachel Kramer Bussel on sex of all stripes.

Philly: Hyper Local: This blog focuses on the local happenings with culture, food, people and more in Philly's neighborhoods.

Get Lit: Lynn Rosen reads between the lines for insights on the local book scene.

Social networking
City Paper had regularly updated profiles on Twitter, Facebook and Instagram.

Contests
Contests: The contest page offered viewers opportunities to win concert, theatre, movie tickets and more.

Masthead
Associate Publisher  
Jennifer Clark

Editor in Chief  
Lillian Swanson

Senior Editor / Music Editor
Patrick Rapa

Arts & Culture Editor
Mikala Jamison

Senior Staff Writer
Emily Guendelsberger

Staff Writer
Jerry Iannelli

Copy Chief
Carolyn Wyman

Production Director
Dennis Crowley

Senior Designer & Social Media Director
Jenni Betz

U.S. Circulation Director
Joseph Lauletta

Account Managers
Sharon MacWilliams, Susanna Simon, Stephan Sitzai 

Classified Advertising Sales
Jennifer Fisher

Founder & Editor Emeritus
Bruce Schimmel

Awards

2015
In 2015, City Paper won 11 Keystone Press Awards, awarded by the Pennsylvania Newspaper Association.

First Place: Investigative Reporting
Ryan Briggs

First Place: Series
Emily Guendelsberger

First Place: Feature Story
Natalie Pompilio

First Place: News Feature Story
Emily Guendelsberger

First Place: News Beat Reporting
Daniel Denvir

First Place: Feature Beat Reporting
Mikala Jamison

First Place: Front Page Design
Brenna Adams, Jenni Betz

Second Place: Personality Profile
Mikala Jamison

Second Place: News Photo
Maria Pouchnikova

Second Place: Video Story
Daniel Denvir, Emily Guendelsberger

Honorable Mention: Ongoing News Coverage
Daniel Denvir

2014
In 2014, City Paper won 15 Keystone Press Awards, awarded by the Pennsylvania Newspaper Association.

First Place: Investigative Reporting
Ryan Briggs

First Place: News Series
Daniel Denvir

First Place: Feature Beat Reporting
Emily Guendelsberger

First Place: Photo Story
Neal Santos

First Place: Sports Photo
Neal Santos

First Place: Front Page Design
Reseca Peskin

First Place: Page Design
Reseca Peskin

First Place: General News
Daniel Denvir

First Place:Ongoing News Coverage
Daniel Denvir & Samantha Melamed

First Place: Featured Story
Ryan Briggs

First Place: Graphic/Photo Illustration
Evan M. Lopez, Emily Guendelsberger & Jess Bergman

First Place: News Beat Reporting
Samantha Melamed

Second Place: Feature Beat Reporting
Adam Erace

Second Place: Business or Consumer Story
Samantha Melamed

Honorable Mention: Column
Daniel Denvir

Honorable Mention: Special Project
Pat Rapa

2013

In 2013, City Paper won 8 Keystone Press Awards, awarded by the Pennsylvania Newspaper Association.

Also in 2013, City Paper won one Association of Alternative Newsweeklies awards.

2012
In 2012, City Paper won six Keystone Press Awards, awarded by the Pennsylvania Newspaper Association.

2011
In 2011, City Paper won two Association of Alternative Newsweeklies awards.

2010
In 2010, City Paper won six Newspaper of the Year (NOY) awards, including the prestigious newspaper of the year honor.

Also in 2010, City Paper won six Keystone Press Awards, awarded by the Pennsylvania Newspaper Association.

2009
In 2009, City Paper won three Newspaper of the Year (NOY) awards.

First Place (tie): General and Departmental News Coverage
First Place: Advertising Excellence
Second Place: Layout & Design

References

Further reading

External links

The Philadelphia City paper

Alternative weekly newspapers published in the United States
Defunct newspapers of Philadelphia
Publications established in 1981
1981 establishments in Pennsylvania